Cursed Earth Asylum is an original novel written by David Bishop and based on the long-running British science fiction comic strip Judge Dredd. It is Bishop's second Judge Dredd novel. At the time of publication (1993), Bishop was editor of the Judge Dredd Megazine.

Synopsis

A dangerous psychic called Soon is being held prisoner in a lunatic asylum in the Cursed Earth on account of his staggeringly vast powers. When Soon escapes and threatens Mega-City One, Judge Dredd, and a party of cadets are sent to stop him, only for Dredd to be framed for murdering the cadets.

Continuity

The book features the return of another psychic called Hope, who first appeared in 1991 in the Judge Anderson story Engram (in 2000 AD # 712–717 and 758–763).

External links
Cursed Earth Asylum at the 2000 AD website (note: the "reprint material" section erroneously refers to another story).

Novels by David Bishop
Judge Dredd novels